The Defence Force of Haiti was the envisaged name of the planned, reconstituted armed forces of the Republic of Haiti. Haiti had not had a regular armed forces since 1995; a process to reestablish them was initiated in 2011 and culminated in their remobilization (under the old name: Forces Armées d'Haiti - FAd'H) in 2017.

History
Due to decades of coups and counter-coups, the regular Haitian Army, Navy, and Air Force were abolished in 1995. The formal disbandment of the military, however, did not end its involvement in national life. In 2004 a paramilitary force of former Haitian soldiers, backed by the United States and France, deposed the government of Jean Bertrand Aristide. Several years later, a group of former members of the Haitian military began the private, voluntary training of young men in field-craft and military tactics as a demonstration of the potential of a new armed force. By 2012 these recruits numbered between 3,000 and 15,000. That same year, Haitian veterans forcibly occupied several decommissioned army posts to press the government to reestablish the military, and later interrupted a meeting of the Chamber of Deputies to demand the approval of Laurent Lamothe's nomination as prime minister, an action which UN officials denounced as an "unacceptable act of intimidation."

In 2011, following his election as president of Haiti, Michel Martelly promised to reestablish the military. The move was generally seen as a popular response to widespread public dissatisfaction with the ongoing United Nations Stabilisation Mission in Haiti; the unsanitary and poor practices of Nepalese UN soldiers were cause to a cholera epidemic while Uruguayan and Pakistani UN troops were allegedly complicit in the rape of Haitian boys. Carl Alexandre, deputy United Nations envoy overseeing police and judicial reform in Haiti, meanwhile blamed "proliferating armed forces" by the Haitian government as a reason for increased bandit attacks in the countryside, and called on the Haitian National Police to be affirmed as the country's only security apparatus.

Critics of the planned force note that Haiti does not have any enemies, however, proponents point to the need to fill a "security vacuum" they say will emerge following the departure of the UN Stabilisation Mission in Haiti, and that a military is needed to fulfill missions such as securing the nation's porous border with the Dominican Republic, responding to natural disasters, and restoring "national pride".

Training and recruitment
An initial plan envisaged a military force of 3,500 personnel operational by 2014. Aided by Ecuador, Haiti had managed to raise and train a force of 41 personnel by September 2013, though this nucleus unit of sappers, officially termed the "Corps of Engineers," was unarmed and mission focused on infrastructure construction. The following January an additional contingent of 30 recruits left the country for training in Ecuador and, in November of that year, a further 40 recruits left for Ecuador to partake in the eight-month course.

In July 2015, Martelly formally announced the new force would be called the Force de Défense d’Haïti (Defence Force of Haiti) and would be tasked with "control of our borders, our sea and air space and [preparing for] the departure of UN forces." According to Martelly, a stepped-up recruitment campaign was set to begin in October 2015.

In October 2017, under the administration of Jovenel and Prime Minister Lafontant, President Moise who is allied with former President Martelly remobilized the Armed Forces. The Haitian National Police remained under a UN mandated mission called MINIJUSTH until its expiration in 2019.

See also

 Gendarmerie of Haiti
 Military history of Haiti
 Armed Forces of Haiti

References

External links
 Official website for the Ministry of Defence 
 euronews video showing inspection of first contingent of FDH troops on return from Ecuador

Military of Haiti
Military history of Haiti